Brunild Pepa (born 22 November 1990) is an Albanian professional footballer who plays as a forward for Albanian club Kastrioti Krujë.

Club career

Teuta Durrës
On 24 June 2014, Pepa returned to Teuta Durrës for a second stint at the club. He player there only in the first part of 2014–15 season, recording 2 goals in 9 league matches, in addition to one cup match.

Vllaznia Shkodër
On 24 June 2016, Pepa completed a move to Vllaznia Shkodër, signing a two-year contract.

Gjilani
In July 2018, Pepa was presented alongside Ansi Nika as the newest player of Football Superleague of Kosovo side Gjilani.

Kastrioti Krujë
On 21 January 2019, Pepa returned in Albania and signed until the end of the campaign for the top flight strugglers Kastrioti Krujë.

References

External links
 FSHF profile

1990 births
Living people
Sportspeople from Lushnjë
Albanian footballers
Association football midfielders
Association football forwards
KS Lushnja players
KF Teuta Durrës players
Flamurtari Vlorë players
KF Bylis Ballsh players
KF Vllaznia Shkodër players
SC Gjilani players
KS Kastrioti players
Kategoria Superiore players
Kategoria e Parë players
Football Superleague of Kosovo players
Albanian expatriate footballers
Expatriate footballers in Kosovo
Albanian expatriate sportspeople in Kosovo